Tost may refer to:

 David Tost (David Origanus, 1588-1628), German astronomer from Silesia
 Two one-sided tests, a kind of equivalence test
 Tost, German exonym for Toszek, a town in Silesia, Poland
 Bagel toast
 "Tost", an Irish poem by Seán Ó Ríordáin